Events from the year 1764 in Scotland.

Incumbents

Law officers 
 Lord Advocate – Thomas Miller of Glenlee
 Solicitor General for Scotland – James Montgomery jointly with Francis Garden; then James Montgomery alone

Judiciary 
 Lord President of the Court of Session – Lord Arniston, the younger
 Lord Justice General – Duke of Queensberry
 Lord Justice Clerk – Lord Minto

Events 
 3 January – Edinburgh Advertiser newspaper begins publication.
 November – The Speculative Society established in Edinburgh as a debating group, part of the Scottish Enlightenment.
 New Byth established as a planned village in Aberdeenshire by the local laird.
 New liturgy for the Scottish Episcopal Church published in Edinburgh.
 The turnip is first cultivated in Scotland as a field crop, by Dawson of Frogden (Roxburghshire).
 Howden Bridge built at Mid Calder.
 Approximate date – Yair Bridge built across the River Tweed by William Mylne.

Births 
 c. 1 February – George Duff, naval officer (killed 1805 at Battle of Trafalgar)
 22 February – Alexander Campbell, musician and miscellaneous writer (died 1824)
 5 May – Robert Craufurd, general (killed 1812 at Siege of Ciudad Rodrigo)
 11 July – Jane Aitken, printer (died 1832 in the United States)
 5 October – Isaac Cruikshank, painter and caricaturist (died 1811 in London)
 10 October – John Dick, minister and theologian (died 1833)
 October – William Symington, mechanical engineer, steamboat pioneer (died 1831 in London)
 6 November – Robert Heron, writer (died 1807 in London)
 Alexander Mackenzie, explorer of northern Canada (died 1820)

Deaths 
 23 May – William Grant, Lord Prestongrange, politician and judge (born 1701; died at Bath)

The arts
 Pompeo Batoni paints portraits of Thomas Dundas and Alexander Gordon, 4th Duke of Gordon in Rome.

See also 

 Timeline of Scottish history

References 

 
Years of the 18th century in Scotland
Scotland
1760s in Scotland